Strecker is a German surname. Notable people with the surname include:

 Adolph Strecker (1822–1871), German chemist who worked with amino acids
 Herman Strecker (1836–1901), American entomologist specialising in butterflies and moths
 Heinrich Strecker (1893–1981), Austrian composer of operettas and popular Viennese music
 Ignatius Jerome Strecker (1917–2003), American prelate of the Roman Catholic Church
 Karl Strecker (1884–1973), German general
 Ludwig Strecker (1853–1943), owner of London music publisher Schott and Co., Limited
 Ludwig Strecker Jr. (1883–1978), music publisher and librettist
 Tania Strecker, Danish model and television presenter in the UK

Other uses
 Strecker amino acid synthesis, synthesize an amino acid from an aldehyde or ketone
 Strecker degradation, converts an α-amino acid into an aldehyde by an imine intermediate
 Strecker's chorus frog, a species of nocturnal tree frog native to the south central United States

See also 
Strick
Stricker
Strack
Struck
Strucker

German-language surnames